Flower Hour also released as Parallel Realities Live (1993) and Live in Concert (2001), is an unauthorized bootleg album by Pat Metheny released in 1992.

Track listing
All compositions by Jack DeJohnette except as indicated

Personnel 
 Pat Metheny – acoustic and electric guitars, guitar synthesizer
 Herbie Hancock – piano, keyboards
 Dave Holland – acoustic and electric bass
 Jack DeJohnette – Drums

References

Pat Metheny albums
1992 live albums
Bootleg recordings